The 1972–73 Lancashire Cup was the sixtieth occasion on which the competition was held. Salford won the trophy by beating Swinton by the score of 25-11 in the final. The match was played at Wilderspool, Warrington, (historically in the county of Lancashire). The attendance was 6,865 and receipts were £3,321.00

Background 

The total number of teams entering the competition remained at last season’s total of 14 with no junior/amateur clubs taking part.
The same fixture format was retained, but due to the decrease in the number of participating clubs, resulted in one "blank" or "dummy" fixtures in the first round, and one bye in the second round.

Competition and results

Round 1 
Involved  7 matches (with one "blank" fixture) and 14 clubs

Round 2 - Quarter-finals 
Involved 3 matches (with one bye) and 7 clubs

Round 3 – Semi-finals  
Involved 2 matches and 4 clubs

Final

Teams and scorers 

Scoring - Try = three (3) points - Goal = two (2) points - Drop goal = two (2) points

The road to success

Notes and comments 
1 * The score of 13-2 is shows in the official St. Helens archives and also in the official Widnes archives . RUGBYLEAGUEproject shows the score as being 11-2
2 * Wilderspool was the home ground of Warrington from 1883 to the end of the 2003 Summer season when they moved into the new purpose built Halliwell Jones Stadium. Wilderspool remained as a sports/Ruugby League ground and is/was used by Woolston Rovers/Warrington Wizards junior club. 
The ground had a final capacity of 9,000 although the record attendance was set in a Challenge cup third round match on 13 March 1948 when 34,304 spectators saw Warrington lose to Wigan 10-13.

See also 
British rugby league system
1972–73 Northern Rugby Football League season
Rugby league county cups
List of defunct rugby league clubs

References

External links
Saints Heritage Society
1896–97 Northern Rugby Football Union season at wigan.rlfans.com
Hull&Proud Fixtures & Results 1896/1897
Widnes Vikings - One team, one passion Season In Review - 1896-97
The Northern Union at warringtonwolves.org

RFL Lancashire Cup
Lancashire Cup